The 1978 FIBA Intercontinental Cup William Jones was the 12th edition of the FIBA Intercontinental Cup for men's basketball clubs. It took place at Buenos Aires. From the FIBA European Champions Cup participated Mobilgirgi Varèse and Real Madrid, from the South American Club Championship participated EC Sírio and Obras Sanitarias, and from the Division I (NCAA) participated the Rhode Island Rams.

Participants

League stage
Day 1, June 19 1978

|}

Day 2, June 20 1978

|}

Day 3, June 22 1978

|}

Day 4, June 23 1978

|}

Day 5, June 24 1978

|}

Final standings

External links
1978 Intercontinental Cup William Jones 

 

1978
1977–78 in European basketball
1977–78 in South American basketball
1977–78 in American college basketball
1978 in Argentine sport
International basketball competitions hosted by Argentina
1978